Wampenite is a rare organic mineral with the formula C18H16, found in Wampen, Fichtelgebirge, Bavaria, Germany.

Similar minerals
Although structurally unique, chemically wampenite is similar to other minerals, like fichtelite, kratochvílite, ravatite, retene/phylloretene, and simonellite.

References

Organic minerals
Monoclinic minerals
Minerals in space group 14
Minerals described in 2017